Liván Osoria Rodriguez (born 5 February 1994) is a Cuban male volleyball player. He was part of the Cuba men's national volleyball team at the 2014 FIVB Volleyball Men's World Championship in Poland.

Clubs
 Santiago de Cuba (2014)

References

Cuban men's volleyball players
Place of birth missing (living people)
Olympic volleyball players of Cuba
Volleyball players at the 2016 Summer Olympics
1994 births
Living people
Pan American Games medalists in volleyball
Pan American Games silver medalists for Cuba
Volleyball players at the 2019 Pan American Games
Medalists at the 2019 Pan American Games
21st-century Cuban people